The 2020–21 season was Kisvárda FC's 3rd season in the OTP Bank Liga and the 18th in existence as a football club.

Transfers

Summer

In:

Out:

Source:

Winter

In:

Out:

Nemzeti Bajnokság I

League table

Results summary

Results by round

Matches

Hungarian Cup

Statistics

Appearances and goals
Last updated on 9 May 2021.

|-
|colspan="14"|Youth players:

|-
|colspan="14"|Players no longer at the club:

|}

Top scorers
Includes all competitive matches. The list is sorted by shirt number when total goals are equal.
Last updated on 9 May 2021

Disciplinary record
Includes all competitive matches. Players with 1 card or more included only.

Last updated on 9 May 2021

Overall
{|class="wikitable"
|-
|Games played || 39 (33 OTP Bank Liga and 6 Hungarian Cup)
|-
|Games won || 17 (12 OTP Bank Liga and 5 Hungarian Cup)
|-
|Games drawn || 10 (10 OTP Bank Liga and 0 Hungarian Cup)
|-
|Games lost || 12 (11 OTP Bank Liga and 1 Hungarian Cup)
|-
|Goals scored || 50
|-
|Goals conceded || 39
|-
|Goal difference || +11
|-
|Yellow cards || 75
|-
|Red cards || 3
|-
|rowspan="1"|Worst discipline ||  Viktor Hey (8 , 1 )
|-
|rowspan="1"|Best result || 10–0 (A) v Kecskéd - Hungarian Cup - 19-09-2020
|-
|rowspan="3"|Worst result || 0–3 (H) v Puskás Akadémia - Nemzeti Bajnokság I - 04-09-2020
|-
| 0–3 (A) v Fehérvár - Nemzeti Bajnokság I - 18-12-2020
|-
| 0–3 (A) v Paks - Nemzeti Bajnokság I - 21-02-2021
|-
|rowspan="1"|Most appearances ||  Claudiu Bumba (36 appearances)
|-
|rowspan="1"|Top scorer ||  Claudiu Bumba (7 goals)
|-
|Points || 61/117 (52.13%)
|-

References

External links
 Official Website
 UEFA
 fixtures and results

Kisvárda FC seasons
Kisvárda